This page lists the most relevant model railway scale standards in the world. Most standards are regional, but some have followers in other parts of the world outside their native region, most notably NEM and NMRA. While the most significant standardised dimension of a model railway scale is the gauge, a typical scale standard covers many more aspects of model railways and defines scale-specific dimensions for items like catenary, rolling stock wheels, loading gauge, curve radii and grades for slopes, for instance.

Scale standards

NEM 
MOROP (the European federation of national model railway associations) is a European organisation which publishes NEM-standards. NEM-standards are used by model railway industry and hobbyists in Europe. The standards are published in French and German and both versions have an official status. Unofficial translations in English from third parties exist for certain NEM-standard sheets.

Model railway scales and gauges are standardized in NEM 010, which covers several gauges for each scale. Narrow gauges are indicated by an additional letter added after the base scale as follows:
 no letter = standard gauge
 m = metre gauge
 e = narrow gauge
 i = industrial
 p = park railway
For instance, a metre-gauge model railway in H0-scale is designated H0m. In German text the letter "f" (for ) is sometimes used instead of "i". The letter "e" is derived from the French word , which translates to "narrow". NEM gauges are arranged conveniently to use the normal gauge of smaller scales as narrow gauges for a certain scale. For instance, H0m gauge is the same as the TT-scale normal gauge, H0e same as the N-scale normal gauge and H0i same as the Z-scale normal gauge.

For H0 and 0 scales, NEM uses the number zero, whereas NMRA uses letter "O" (HO instead of H0).

NMRA 
The NMRA (National Model Railroad Association) standardized the first model railway scales in the 1940s. NMRA standards are used widely in North America and by certain special interest groups all over the world. To some extent NMRA and NEM standards are compatible, but in many areas, the two standards specify certain model railway details in somewhat incompatible ways for the same scale.

There are two NMRA standard sheets where the scales have been defined. NMRA standard S-1.2 covers the popular model railway scales and S-1.3 defines scales with deep flanges for model railways with very sharp curves or other garden railway specific design features.

In certain NMRA scales an alternative designation is sometimes used corresponding the length of one prototype foot in scale either in millimetres or in inches. For instance, 3.5 mm scale is the same as HO. For HO and O -scales, NMRA uses the letter "O" whereas NEM uses the number zero (H0 instead of HO).

NMRA has defined alternative, more prototypical, track and wheel system standards in standard sheet S-1.1 for the purposes of reproducing the prototype proportions in scale model more realistically. These model railway standards are based on the full size prototype standards and the scale model operational reliability is therefore reduced in comparison to the models conforming to the normal NMRA standards. Proto and finescale rails and wheels are generally not compatible with the normal scale model railway material with the same scale ratio.

Proto scale was originally developed by the Model Railway Study Group in Great Britain in 1966 and later adopted into NMRA standards with modifications necessary for the North American prototype railway standards. Proto scale reproduces faithfully the prototype wheel tread profile and track work used by the Association of American Railroads and the American Railway Engineering Association.

Finescale reproduces the prototype wheel tread profile and track work used by the Association of American Railroads and the American Railway Engineering Association with minor compromises for performance and manufacturability.

NMRA popular railway scales 

Note: to interpret the number in the left-hand column, these examples illustrate:
 3.5 mm scale (HO): 3.5 mm scale measurement = 1 foot (304.8 mm) prototype. The ratio is therefore 1:87.08571, usually reported as 1:87.
 1 in scale: 1 in scale measurement = 1 foot prototype, the ratio is reported as 1:12.

NMRA deep flange scales

NMRA proto scales

NMRA finescale

British 
The main railways in Great Britain use the international standard gauge of  but the loading gauge is narrower and lower than in the rest of Europe with the same standard gauge. This is one of the main reasons why the country has traditionally used its own distinctive model railway scales which can rarely be found outside the British Isles.

When H0 scale was being introduced, the motors available were too large to fit in scale-sized bodies and so as a compromise the scale was increased from 3.5 mm to 4 mm to the foot, but the gauge was not changed so other elements could be shared. For 00 therefore the track is narrower than it should be for the scale used. EM and P4 standards correct this anomaly by adopting a wider track gauge.

The globally more-widespread international NEM and NMRA scale standards are relatively rare in Great Britain and used almost exclusively by those modelling foreign prototypes.

Japanese 
While there are Japanese model railway manufacturers that export their products to other parts of the world and follow the scale standards of the export destinations, in Japan there are several domestic scales that are popular in the country but virtually unknown elsewhere. International NEM and NMRA scales are also used by some Japanese modellers.

Lego trains

The  length is not derived by a certain scale ratio. While HO scale is a 1:87 scale (3.5 mm to 1 foot), resulting in a  gauge from real life prototype  standard gauge.

Conversely, modeling standard gauge in Lego trains would yield a scaling of (37.5:1435 =) 1:38.3.

Live steam 
Live steam model railways are not standardized systematically by any single standardization body. There are, however, certain scales and gauges which have become de facto standards and in some cases correspond to either NEM or NMRA standard scales. One example is the "IBLS" (International Brotherhood of Live Steamers), an informal organization which has published standards for some of the gauges. Many clubs have their own standards, which also may vary slightly from country to country. Hornby Railways have pioneered commercial model live steam in 00 (1:76 scale on 16.5 mm gauge), the existing models are heated using a controllable electric current through the two running rails and have the steam pressure chamber in the model tender.

Using  - 0 gauge - track, there is an extensive range of 16 mm to the foot scale [1:19] live-steam and other types of locomotives, rolling stock and accessories. Many of these models are dual gauge, and can be converted to run on  track (gauge 1), and radio control is common. Locomotives in this scale are generally large and "chunky", and can range from the tiny 0-4-0 seen on Welsh slate quarry lines all the way up to the very largest found in the UK, such as the ex-ACR NG/G16 Beyer-Garratt locomotives, seen running on the Welsh Highland Railway in North Wales. The hobby is supported by a number of 16 mm live steam and electric traction builders, dominated by the likes of Roundhouse Engineering and Accucraft UK.

Static model

Historical 
There have been many short-lived and often promising model railway scales which are very much defunct nowadays. Quite often these were backed by only the company that created a new scale in the first place.

See also 
 National Model Railroad Association
 Normen Europäischer Modelleisenbahnen
 Rail transport modelling scales
 Rail transport modelling
 List of narrow gauge model railway scales

References

External links 
 "About Gauge" guide from Lionel discussing O versus O27 gauge
 "More About Gauge" guide from Lionel discussing gauges other than O

 

 
Lists of standards
Modelling scale standards